Theory of value is an ambiguous term, and may refer to:

Theory of value (economics), where value is meant as economic worth of goods and services
Value theory, where value is meant in the philosophical sense